Qena Governorate is one of the governorates of Egypt. Located in the southern part of the country, it covers a stretch of the Nile valley. Its capital is the city of Qena.

Overview
The rate of poverty is more than 60% in this governorate but recently some social safety networks have been provided in the form of financial assistance and job opportunities. The funding has been coordinated by the country's Ministry of Finance and with assistance from international organizations.

Municipal divisions
The governorate is divided into municipal divisions with a total estimated population as of July 2017 of 3,181,688. In the case of Qena governorate, there is one kism, a number of marakiz and 1 new city. Sometimes a markaz and a kism share a name.

Population

According to population estimates from 2015 the majority of residents in the governorate lived in rural areas, with an urbanization rate of only 19.7%. Out of an estimated 3,045,504 people residing in the governorate, 2,445,051 people lived in rural areas as opposed to only 600,453 in urban areas.

According to population estimates from 2018 the majority of residents in the governorate live in rural areas, with an urbanization rate of only 18.7%. Out of an estimated 3,224,000 people residing in the governorate, 2,621,000 people live in rural areas as opposed to only 603,000 in urban areas.

Cities and towns
As of 2018, nine cities (or towns) in Qena had a population of over 15,000 inhabitants.

Industrial zones
According to the Egyptian Governing Authority for Investment and Free Zones (GAFI), in affiliation with the Ministry of Investment (MOI), there are two industrial zones in this governorate: Al-Kalaheen Industrial Zone - Qeft, and Hou Industrial Zone Nag'a Hamadi.

Projects and programs
In 1981, the Basic Village Service Program (BVS) had several water, road and other projects going on in several marakiz in the Qena Governorate.

In 2016, Switzerland committed to funding a solid waste management program in Qena, a project with the Egyptian Ministry of Environment that will conclude in 2021. The National Solid Waste Management Programme (NSWMP) involves the construction of infrastructure for new as well as the expansion and improvement of existing waste treatment, landfill, and recycling facilities.

In 2018, the Our District (Hayenna) project was launched with the help and investment of Switzerland. The project is to improve land use, and living conditions for people in the Qena Governorate.

See also
Dendera

References

External links
 El Wattan News of Qena Governorate

 
Governorates of Egypt